Ilya Lvovich Maizelis (born Uman, 28 December 1894, died Moscow 23 December 1978) was a Soviet chess player, writer, and theoretician.

Maizelis was better known as a writer than as a player. He played in several Moscow city championships during the 1920s and 1930s, his best result being 4th place in 1932. Considered a "first category" player under the Soviet system, the next rank below Master, his equivalent Elo rating in modern terms was in the 2200s. 

He was on the editorial board of 64 from 1925 to 1930, and was executive secretary of the English-language Soviet Chess Chronicle from 1943 to 1946. He was the author of a number of instructional works on chess and theoretical works on the endgame. He also translated a number of German language chess books into Russian, including Aron Nimzowitsch's My System and Emanuel Lasker's Manual of Chess.

References

1894 births
1978 deaths
Soviet chess players
Chess theoreticians